United Bank for Africa Zambia Limited, also UBA Zambia, is a commercial bank in Zambia. It is licensed by the Bank of Zambia, the central bank and national banking regulator.

Location
The headquarters and main branch of UBA Zambia Limited are located at Stand 22768, Acacia Park, at the Corner of Great East Road and Thabo Mbeki Road, in the central business district of Lusaka, the capital and largest city of Zambia. The geographical coordinates of the bank's headquarters are:15°23'28.0"S, 28°19'07.0"E (Latitude:-15.391111; Longitude:28.318611).

Overview
The bank serves the banking needs of large corporations, small and medium sized enterprises, individuals and government departments. The bank is a 100 percent subsidiary of United Bank for Africa, a Nigerian-headquartered financial services conglomerate, with banking subsidiaries in 20 sub-Saharan countries, whose total assets were valued at US$14.6 billion, as of 31 December 2019.

History
UBA Zambia was established in 2010, following successful start-ups by the parent company in Kenya, Uganda and Tanzania. UBA Zambia is the first UBA subsidiary to be established in Southern Africa. UBA Zambia promotes cashless banking and the use of internet banking products.

Branch network
, the bank maintained a network of branches at the following locations: 1. Acacia Park Branch: Acacia Park, Lusaka Main Branch 2. Kamwala Branch: Independence Avenue, Kamwala, Lusaka 3. Kitwe Branch: 3 Mega Shopping Centre, Corner of Enos Comba Road and Independence Avenue, Kitwe.

Governance
The Chairman of the ten-person Board of Directors of UBA Zambia, is Dr. Tukiya Kankasa-Mabula. Chinedu Obeta, serves as the Managing Director and CEO of the bank.

See also

References

External links
  Website of United Bank for Africa Zambia Limited
 Website of Bank of Zambia
 Liberia: Six African Subsidiaries of UBA Group Win Bank of the Year At the Bankers Awards As of 3 December 2020.

Banks of Zambia
United Bank for Africa
Companies based in Lusaka
Banks established in 2010
2010 establishments in Zambia